General elections were held in Western Samoa on 7 February 1970. All candidates ran as independents, with voting restricted to matais and citizens of European origin ("individual voters"), with the matais electing 45 MPs and Europeans two. Following the election, Tupua Tamasese Lealofi IV became Prime Minister.

Background
A parliamentary debate on introducing universal suffrage was held on 27 March 1969. The motion by Letele Taneolevao Siaosi, the youngest member of parliament, would still limit candidacy to the 8,500 matais, but allow all citizens over the age of 21 (numbering over 30,000) to vote in elections. Prior to 1967 elections, the number of matais was increased significantly, as candidates seeking to increase their vote were able to bestow titles on people to create new matai. Following the elections, a law was introduced that prohibited conferring of a matai title on anyone younger than 21.

Although Prime Minister Fiame Mata'afa had been in favour of universal suffrage during the 1954 and 1960 constitutional conventions, he opposed the motion, arguing that voters had approved limiting suffrage to matais in the 1961 constitutional referendum, which had been held under universal suffrage. Members of the Legislative Assembly voted 37–6 against the motion.

Campaign
Over 150 candidates contested the elections. Fifteen candidates were returned unopposed, including Faimaala Filipo, who became Western Samoa's first female MP, and Prime Minister Fiame Mata'afa.

Results
Twenty-one of the forty-seven elected members were new to the Legislative Assembly.

Aftermath
The newly elected Legislative Assembly met for the first time on 25 February. In the first round of the election for Prime Minister, Fiame Mata'afa received 19 votes, Tupua Tamasese Lealofi 17 and Tufuga Efi 10. The second ballot saw Mata'afa and Tupua both receive 23 votes. A third round of voting was held the following day, which Tupua won by 25 votes to 20. It was reported that Mata'afa would almost certainly have won in the second round had one of his supporters, To'omata Lilomaiava Tua, not died the previous week.

Tupua's new cabinet consisted entirely of first-time ministers.

A cabinet reshuffle took place in March 1971 when Fatialofa Momo'e resigned. Va'ai Kolone was brought into the government as Minister of Health, with Fuimaono Moasope becoming Minister for the Post Office, Radio and Broadcasting in place of Momo'e. Minister of Justice Tuala Paulo and Minister for Education Amoa Tausilia also exchanged portfolios.

See also
List of members of the Legislative Assembly of Western Samoa (1970–1973)

References

External links
Samoan election results by constituency 1964–2016 Samoa Election Results Database

Western Samoa
General
Elections in Samoa
Non-partisan elections
Election and referendum articles with incomplete results